The kongsi federations of West Borneo were Chinese autonomous entities that conducted the mining of gold, and later expanded to other fields of business, based mainly in the Montrado and Mandor areas. The region never unified into one kongsi federation, and rather was a conglomeration of small kongsi organizations that mainly pledged to two zongting (assembly halls): the Heshun Confederation and Lanfang Republic in Montrado and Mandor, respectively. The following is a list of all mentioned kongsis and general Chinese organizations that we have from existing records and later Dutch accounts.

Kongsis before the formation of Heshun (mid-18th century – 1776)

Organizations mentioned in the Chronicle of the Lanfang Kongsi 
The ''Chronicle of the Lanfang Kongsi'' details the first clan-based organizations that existed in Borneo, around the mid-18th century. Four were documented:

 Shanxin Jinhu 山心金湖 (Shanxin gold-lake)
 Jusheng kongsi 聚勝公司 (Jusheng kongsi)
 Sida Jiawei 四大家围 (Four Great Families)
 Lanheying 兰和营 (Lanhe guild)

*Note that "clan-based organizations" was a very general term, as there appeared to be many names for these fraternities, including the aforementioned hui, but also jinhu 金湖, jiawei 家围, shansha 山沙, bali 把坜 and fen 分. Even though one of the mentioned organizations has the kongsi 公司 suffix, it is uncertain if any of these organizations had the full capacities of the standard kongsi that will become the norm later in history.

Non-mining related organizations 
Chinese organizations were not limited to mining. Other groups of Chinese, either connected by similar beliefs or occupations, created similar organizations, also called hui. There were two recorded:

 Tiandihui (Thien-Thi-Foei) 天地會- The Heaven and Earth Society, an anti-Qing secretive folk organization, found its way among the merchants and farmers of West Borneo. They existed separately from the mining kongsis and harassed the miners, and was one of the reasons the Heshun Confederation was created. They lost influence following the initial wars waged between them and the Heshun Confederation.
 Lanfanghui (Lan-Fong-Foei) 蘭芳會- A separate association that can be considered to have a connection with the Tiandihui. They were recorded to have a settlement near Kulor, before being kicked out after they attempted to conquer the city's Teochew merchants. Here, they moved south to Mandor, where Luo Fangbo rose to its leader and reformed it into the Lanfang kongsi.

Kongsis during their height (1776–1840)

Montrado Region

Lara Region

Budok Region

Mandor Region 

*[H] denotes a member of the Heshun / Fosjoen zongting. Italicized kongsis denote privatized mines, some of whom were called "kongsi".

Other minor kongsis with little to no information included: the Dahong kongsi (打洪公司), He’an kongsi (和安公司), Jusheng kongsi (聚勝公司), and the Mianyuan kongsi (綿遠公司).

Post-autonomous period (1850–1900) 
Following the destruction of the Dagang kongsi, and with association, the Heshun zongting, the Chinese attempted to reorganize into a new movement. The Jiulong kongsi (Kioe-lioeng-kong-si) 九龍公司, as it was called, they harassed Dutch soldiers. In 1854, they burned down Montrado, the former Heshun capital, and attempted to reorganize before they were caught and executed. The movement lasted less than a year.

Yet another secret organization resurfaced, from the ancient remnants of the Tiandihui. The Sandianhui (Sam-Tiam-Foei) 三點會, which the Dutch called the Three Fingered Society, aimed instead for general civil obedience and elimination of pro-Dutch Chinese. Unlike the Jiulong kongsi, the Sandianhui were able to extend their reach and cause disturbances to the new Dutch occupied West Borneo.

References 

Kongsi federations
Chinese diaspora in Southeast Asia
Former countries in Southeast Asia
Former republics
Precolonial states of Indonesia
Chinese-speaking countries and territories